Castle Buildings is the name given to a group of Northern Ireland Executive buildings in the Stormont Estate in Belfast. They are the headquarters for the Executive Office, the Department of Health and the Department of Justice. The group of buildings have previously been used by the Northern Ireland Office. The complex is notable as the location of the negotiations leading to the Good Friday Agreement.

It was announced on 29 July 2009 that the Department of Justice would be based in two offices on the first floor of Castle Buildings.

See also 
 Office of the First Minister and deputy First Minister
 First Minister and deputy First Minister
 Department of Justice
 Department of Health, Social Services and Public Safety
 Belfast Agreement
 Northern Ireland Office

References

External links 
 Office of the First Minister and deputy First Minister
 Department of Health, Social Services and Public Safety

Government buildings in Northern Ireland
Buildings of the Government of the United Kingdom